The Diocese of Derby is a Church of England diocese in the Province of Canterbury, roughly covering the same area as the County of Derbyshire.  Its diocesan bishop is the Bishop of Derby whose seat (cathedra) is at Derby Cathedral.  The diocesan bishop is assisted by one suffragan bishop, the Bishop of Repton.

Bishops
The Bishop of Derby is Libby Lane. The diocesan Bishop is assisted by a suffragan Bishop of Repton (Malcolm Macnaughton). The provincial episcopal visitor (for traditional Anglo-Catholic parishes in this diocese who have petitioned for alternative episcopal oversight) is the Bishop suffragan of Ebbsfleet. Derby is one of the few dioceses not to license the provincial episcopal visitor as an honorary assistant bishop.

There is one former bishop licensed as honorary assistant bishops in the diocese:

2008–present: retired former Bishop of Sheffield Jack Nicholls lives in Chapel-en-le-Frith and is also licensed in neighbouring Diocese of Manchester.

Roger Jupp, a former Bishop of Popondetta, returned to parish ministry in England in 2005. He was vicar of St Laurence’s Church, Long Eaton, from 2012 until retiring in 2018. Jupp is not an honorary assistant bishop of the diocese.

Archdeaconries
The Archdeaconry of Derby was originally part of the Diocese of Lichfield, but was moved to form part of the Diocese of Southwell when that diocese was created in 1884.  On 7 July 1927 the archdeaconries of Derby and Chesterfield became the Diocese of Derby.

Until 2022 the Diocese of Derby contained these two archdeaconries: the Archdeaconry of Derby was divided into the deaneries of Derby City, Dove and Derwent, Mercia, and South East Derbyshire; and the Archdeaconry of Chesterfield, was divided into the deaneries of Carsington, Hardwick, North East Derbyshire, and Peak.

On 6 June 2022, the Bishop of Derby dissolved the two existing Archdeaconries of Derby and of Chesterfield in order to erect three new Archdeaconries: of Derby City and South Derbyshire, of East Derbyshire, and of Derbyshire Peak and Dales. On 12 June, she collated Carol Coslett (hitherto Archdeacon of Chesterfield) as Archdeacon of Derbyshire Peak and Dales; Matthew Trick as Archdeacon of Derby City and South Derbyshire; and Karen Hamblin as Archdeacon of East Derbyshire. Coslett retired during February 2023.

References

External links

 
Christian organizations established in 1927
Derby
Christianity in Derbyshire
Christianity in Derby